For historical and contemporary Jewish populations by country, see Jews by country.

By period

Ancient period 

 Ancient Israel and Judah
 Israelites
 Kingdom of Judah
 Kingdom of Israel
 Hebrew Bible
 Biblical archeology
 Canaanite and Aramaic inscriptions
 Ancient Hebrew texts
 Assyrian captivity
 Ten Lost Tribes
 Judah's revolts against Babylon
 Siege of Jerusalem (587 BCE)

 Babylonian captivity

Second Temple period 
 Second Temple period
 Yehud (Persian province)
 Maccabean revolt
 Hasmonean dynasty
 Herodian dynasty
 Roman Judaea
 Jewish-Roman Wars
 First Jewish-Roman War
 The Jewish War
 Jerusalem riots of 66
 Alexandria riot (66)
 Siege of Yodfat
 Battle of Beth Horon (66)
 Siege of Gush Halav
 Zealot Temple Siege
 Siege of Jerusalem (70 CE)
 Siege of Masada
 Kitos War
 Bar Kokhba revolt
Second Temple Judaism
 Pharisees
 Sadducees
 Essenes
 Zealots
 Jewish Christians

 Archaeology
 Dead Sea Scrolls

Late antiquity 

History of the Jews in the Roman Empire
Talmudic academies in Babylonia
Jewish revolt against Heraclius

Medieval period 

 History of European Jews in the Middle Ages
 Golden age of Jewish culture in Spain
 Medieval antisemitism
 Persecution of Jews during the Black Death
 Edict of Expulsion
 Golden age of Jewish culture in Spain
 History of the Jews and the Crusades
 Islam and Judaism
 History of the Jews under Muslim rule
 Cairo Geniza

Modern period 

 Zionism
 History of Zionism
 History of the Jews during World War II
 The Holocaust
 History of Israel

By country or region 

 History of the Jews in Africa
 History of the Jews in Afghanistan
 History of the Jews in Austria
 History of the Jews in Innsbruck
 History of the Jews in Belarus
 History of the Jews in Central Asia
 History of the Jews in China
 Kaifeng Jews
 History of the Jews in the Czech Republic
 History of the Jews in Egypt
 History of the Jews in Ethiopia
 Beta Israel
 History of the Jews in Europe
 Antisemitism in Europe
 History of the Jews in France
 Antisemitism in France
 History of the Jews in Germany
 Antisemitism in 21st-century Germany
 History of the Jews in Hungary
 History of the Jews in India
 Baghdadi Jews
 Bene Ephraim
 Bene Israel
 Bnei Menashe
 Cochin Jews
 History of the Jews in Kolkata
 Jewish Community of Mumbai
 Paradesi Jews
 Sephardic Jews in India
 History of the Jews in Iran
 Persian Jews
 History of the Jews in Iraq
 History of the Jews in the Land of Israel
 History of the Jews in Latin America and the Caribbean
 History of the Jews under Muslim rule
 Antisemitism in the Arab world
 Antisemitism in Islam
 Islamic–Jewish relations
 Relations between Nazi Germany and the Arab world
 History of the Jews in Poland
 History of the Jews in Romania
 History of the Jews in Russia
 Antisemitism in Russia
 History of the Jews in the Soviet Union
 Antisemitism in the Soviet Union
 History of the Jews in Serbia
 History of the Jews in Ukraine
 Antisemitism in Ukraine
 History of the Jews in the United Kingdom
 Antisemitism in the United Kingdom
 History of the Jews in England
 History of the Jews in Scotland
 Resettlement of the Jews in England
 History of the Jews in the United States
 American Jews
 Antisemitism in the United States
 Antisemitism in the United States in the 21st century
 History of antisemitism in the United States
 History of the Jews in Baltimore
 History of the Jews in Chicago
 History of the Jews in Colonial America
 History of the Jews in Los Angeles
 History of the Jews in New York
 History of the Jews in Philadelphia
 History of the Jews in San Francisco
 History of the Jews in South Florida
 History of the Jews in Washington, D.C.

Timelines 

 Kings of Israel and Judah
 Timeline of Jewish history
 Timeline of anti-Zionism
 Timeline of antisemitism
 Timeline of antisemitism in the 19th century
 Timeline of antisemitism in the 20th century
 Timeline of antisemitism in the 21st century
 Timeline of the Holocaust
 Timeline of the Palestine region
 Timeline of Zionism

Languages 
 Hebrew
 Biblical Hebrew
 Mishnaic Hebrew
 Modern Hebrew
 Aramaic
 Jewish Palestinian Aramaic
 Jewish Babylonian Aramaic
 Jewish Neo-Aramaic dialect of Barzani
 Jewish Neo-Aramaic dialect of Betanure
 Jewish Neo-Aramaic dialect of Zakho
 Northeastern Neo-Aramaic
 Trans-Zab Jewish Neo-Aramaic
 Inter-Zab Jewish Neo-Aramaic
 Judaeo-Spanish
 Judeo-Persian
 Arabic
 Judeo-Iraqi Arabic
 Judeo-Moroccan Arabic
 Judeo-Tripolitanian Arabic
 Judeo-Tunisian Arabic
 Judeo-Yemeni Arabic
Yevanic
 Yiddish

See also 

 Index of Jewish history–related articles
 Jewish ethnic divisions
 Outline of Judaism
 Timeline of Jewish history
 Traditional Jewish chronology

Notes

Further reading 
 Allegro, John. The chosen people: A study of Jewish history from the time of the exile until the revolt of Bar Kocheba (Andrews UK, 2015).
 Alpher, Joseph. Encyclopedia of Jewish history: events and eras of the Jewish people (1986) online free to borrow

External links

 The Jewish History Resource Center. Project of the Dinur Center for Research in Jewish History, The Hebrew University of Jerusalem.
 The State of Israel The Jewish History Resource Center, Project of the Dinur Center for Research in Jewish History, The Hebrew University of Jerusalem
 Jewish History and Culture Encyclopaedia Official Site of the 22-volume Encyclopaedia Judaica